Alan Ellis may refer to:

 Alan Ellis, British software engineer, founder of Oink's Pink Palace
 Alan Ellis (lawyer) (1890–1960), British lawyer and parliamentary draftsman
 Alan Ellis (Home and Away)